Esprit Barthet (6 October 1919 – 4 July 1999) was an artist born in Valletta, Malta on 6 October 1919. Son of Camillo and Guzeppina Grixti.

He started art studies in Valletta, at the Government School of Arts.  He went to Rome where he attended the Regia Accademia di Belle Arti and later to England, at the Academy of Arts in Bath. In the early 1950s he started experimenting with cubism and the abstract. Much of his work can be admired in public places, Government Departments and in many private collections in Malta and abroad.

In 1944, he married Teresa Borg and had six children.

He died on 4 July 1999.

There is a street named after him: 'Triq Esprit Barthet' in Swieqi, Malta. Triq means street in Maltese.

Training
1932 - School of Arts, Malta 1932 Under Robert and Edward Caruana Dingli
1938-1939 - Accademia d'Belle Arti, Rome Under Carlo Siviero
1947 - Academy of Arts in Bath Corsham, Wiltshire, England

Style
Portraits; Romantic Tradition; cubism; abstract

Awards
He was awarded the title of Knight of the Italian Republic by the Italian Government and also invested as a member of the Order of St. John.

Paintings

Portraits

Prime Minister of Malta Dr. Francesco Buhagiar 1923-1924 (Oil on Canvas - 127x100cm)
Prime Minister of Malta Dr. Enrico Mizzi 1950 (Oil on Canvas - 122x92cm)

Prime Minister of Malta Dr. Gorg Borg Olivier 1950-1955 and 1962-1971 (Oil on Canvas - 122x91cm)
Prime Minister of Malta Dr. Karmenu Mifsud Bonnici (Oil on Canvas - 80x95cm)
President of Malta Dr. Vincent Tabone (Oil on Canvas - 118x75cm)
Attorney General of Malta Dr. Anthony Borg Barthet (Oil on Canvas - 100x75cm)
Governor-General of Malta Sir Maurice Dorman (Oil on Canvas - 184x122cm)

Rooftops
Barthet is also known for his abstract rooftops.

National School of Art
Parliament established the National School of Art in the 1920s. During the reconstruction period that followed the Second World War, the emergence of the "Modern Art Group", whose members included Josef Kalleya (1898–1998), George Preca (1909–1984), Anton Inglott (1915–1945), Emvin Cremona (1919–1986), Frank Portelli (1922-2004), Antoine Camilleri (1922-2005) and Esprit Barthet (1919–1999) greatly enhanced the local art scene.

References

https://web.archive.org/web/20111007144223/https://opm.gov.mt/prev-prime-ministers
Esprit Barthet, Portraits by: Dennis Vella (Malta, National Museum of Fine Arts, 2000)
http://www.baacorsham.co.uk/adatabase.htm Bath Academy of Art Corsham Alumni
Esprit Barthet (1919–1999): A Critical Evaluation of His Artistic Development, By: Nicoline Sagona B.A.(Hons) History of Art June 2001 Dissertation

External links
 PORTRAITS OF THE PRIME MINISTERS OF MALTA

20th-century Maltese painters
1919 births
1999 deaths
People from Valletta
Maltese stamp designers
Portrait painters
Maltese expatriates in Italy
Maltese expatriates in the United Kingdom